Vasslivatnet is a lake in the municipality of Heim in Trøndelag county, Norway. The lake is a man-made lake along the river Søo. There is a dam on the west end that is part of a hydropower plant.

See also
List of lakes in Norway

References

Heim, Norway
Lakes of Trøndelag
Reservoirs in Norway